Seven Men and One Brain also known as Criminal Affair and Criminal Symphony is a 1968 Italian/Argentinian international co-production crime comedy heist film produced and directed by and also starring a non-singing Rossano Brazzi.

Plot
Criminologist Ross Simpson seems to have everything that one could desire; the respect of his university students, being an author, and having a secret identity. The only thing Simpson doesn't have is a large amount of money. Simpson's secret identity involves planning what he regards as perfect crimes, however they fail due to the stupidity and bumbling of the criminals he recruits to carry out his secret schemes.

Simpson's publishers send him on an all expenses paid trip to Buenos Aires that includes accommodation and an attractive secretary. Putting his writing on hold, Simpson schemes to rob the patrons of the Teatro Colón during the opening performance of La traviata using a gang of Argentinian criminals who are trained to sing. Things begin to go awry when Simpson is pursued by the angry Italian criminals who failed on one of his Italian jobs and a variety of sexy women who seem to get in his way...

Cast
Rossano Brazzi  as	Ross Simpson
Ann-Margret  as Leticia 
Barbara Nichols as Miss Archillar
Hélène Chanel  as 	Georgette
Gina Maria Hidalgo  as	Ana Veronesi
Lando Buzzanca  as	Esteban de Flori
Mimma Biscardi 		
Renzo Petretto  as	Crook
Osvaldo Pacheco as José
Alberto Dalbés  as	Schwartz (as Alberto D'Alves)
Rafael Carret as Antonio (as Raphael Garret)
Juan Carlos Lamas as Crook
Javier Portales as	Crook
Augusto Codecá as 	Crook
Alfonso Senatore as Crook
Ricardo Castro Ríos as	Crook
Nathán Pinzón as	Crook
Roger Smith as a gambler

Production
It was one of several films Ann-Margret made in Europe around this time.

Release
The film was a box office bomb. It was released in the United States as Criminal Affair, in a version re-dubbed, re-edited and re-scored by the distributor.

Reception
The film was generally badly received by critics. A contemporary review of La Prensa described the film as a ripoff of Big Deal on Madonna Street, "but Brazzi is no Monicelli or Gassman. The result is unbearable... the performers... are far below what they can give". Another contemporary review from L'Unità outlined the film as an annoying film and a poor imitation of Seven Golden Men, with a bleak story and a badly mistcast Brazzi ("an actor who can do everything but the gangster").

Notes

External links
 

1968 films
Italian multilingual films
Argentine multilingual films
1960s Italian-language films
Italian heist films
Italian crime comedy films
English-language Italian films
1960s English-language films
1960s crime comedy films
1960s heist films
1968 comedy films
English-language Argentine films
1960s Spanish-language films
Films shot in Buenos Aires
Argentine crime comedy films
1960s Italian films